Santa Ana is a municipality in the El Petén department of Guatemala. It contains 7,792 people.

Municipalities of the Petén Department